Attorney General Barrett may refer to:

George F. Barrett (1907–1980), Attorney General of Illinois
James E. Barrett (1922–2011), Attorney General of Wyoming

See also
Elizabeth Barrett-Anderson (born 1953), Attorney General of Guam
General Barrett (disambiguation)